Vedrana Grgin-Fonseca (born 13 January 1975 in Split, SFR Yugoslavia) is a former Croatian female basketball player.

External links
Profile at eurobasket.com

1975 births
Living people
Basketball players from Split, Croatia
Croatian women's basketball players
Small forwards
Los Angeles Sparks players
Women's National Basketball Association players from Croatia
Mediterranean Games gold medalists for Croatia
Mediterranean Games medalists in basketball
Competitors at the 1997 Mediterranean Games